A glowworm is the glowing larva stage of various insects.

Glowworm may also refer to:

Glowworm (astronomy), the luminous trail of a tiny meteor
Glowworm (comics), two unrelated Marvel Comics characters
Glowworm Records, a subsidiary of Epic Records
"The Glow-Worm", a song written by Paul Lincke
, three British Navy ships
Glo Worm, a children's toy 
Gloworm, a house music group active in the 1990s
"Glow Worm", a song by Skrillex
"Glowworm", a song by The Apples in Stereo on their album Fun Trick Noisemaker
Glow-worm, a UK boiler manufacturer and one of the eight brands that form the Vaillant Group
The Glowworm, a character in the children's book James and the Giant Peach